Rotenburg may refer to:

Rotenburg (district), Lower Saxony, Germany
Rotenburg an der Wümme, capital of the district
Rotenburg an der Fulda, near Kassel in Hesse
Rothenburg ob der Tauber, in the Franconia region of Bavaria
Hersfeld-Rotenburg, a district in Hesse, Germany

See also
Rotenberg (disambiguation)
Rothenberg (disambiguation)
Rothenburg (disambiguation)
Rothenberg, Hesse, Germany
Rottenburg (disambiguation)